In marine navigation, a pelorus is a reference tool for maintaining bearing of a vessel at sea. It is a "simplified compass" without a directive element, suitably mounted and provided with vanes to permit observation of relative bearings.

The instrument was named for one Pelorus, said to have been the pilot for Hannibal, circa 203 BC.

Ancient use 

Harold Gatty described the use of a pelorus by Polynesians before the use of a compass. In equatorial waters the nightly course of stars overhead is nearly uniform during the year.  This regularity simplified navigation for the Polynesians using a pelorus, or dummy compass:

Reading from North to South, in their rising and setting positions, these stars are:
{| class="wikitable"
|+ Stars
|- valign="top"
! Point 
! Star
|- valign="top"
| N || Polaris 
|- valign="top"
| NbE || "the Guards" (Ursa Minor)
|- valign="top"
| NNE || Alpha Ursa Major
|- valign="top"
| NEbN ||Alpha Cassiopeiae
|- valign="top"
| NE || Capella
|- valign="top"
| NEbE || Vega
|- valign="top"
| ENE || Arcturus 
|- valign="top"
| EbN || the Pleiades 
|- valign="top"
| E || Altair 
|- valign="top"
| EbS || Orion's belt 
|- valign="top"
| ESE || Sirius 
|- valign="top"
| SEbE || Beta Scorpionis 
|- valign="top"
| SE || Antares
|- valign="top"
| SEbS || Alpha Centauri
|- valign="top"
| SSE || Canopus
|- valign="top"
| SbE || Achernar
|- valign="top"
| S || Southern Cross
|} 
The true position of these stars is only approximate to their theoretical equidistant rhumbs on the sidereal compass. Over time, the elaboration of the pelorus points led to the modern compass rose.

Modern use 

In appearance and use, a pelorus resembles a compass or compass repeater, with sighting vanes or a sighting telescope attached, but it has no directive properties. That is, it remains at any relative direction to which it is set. It is generally used by setting 000° at the lubber's line. Relative bearings are then observed. They can be converted to bearings true, magnetic, grid, etc., by adding the appropriate heading. The direct use of relative bearings is sometimes of value. A pelorus is useful, for instance, in determining the moment at which an aid to navigation is broad on the beam. It is also useful in measuring pairs of relative bearings which can be used to determine distance off and distance abeam of a navigational aid.

If the true heading is set at the lubber's line, true bearings are observed directly. Similarly, compass bearings can be observed if the compass heading is set at the lubber's line, etc. However, the vessel must be on the heading to which the pelorus is set if accurate results are to be obtained, or else a correction must be applied to the observed results. Perhaps the easiest way of avoiding error is to have the steersman indicate when the vessel is on course. This is usually done by calling out "mark, mark, mark" as long as the vessel is within a specified fraction of a degree of the desired heading. The observer, who is watching a distant object across the pelorus, selects an instant when the vessel is steady and is on course. An alternative method is to have the observer call out "mark" when the relative bearing is steady, and the steersman note the heading. If the compass is swinging at the moment of observation, the observation should be rejected. The number of degrees between the desired and actual headings is added if the vessel is to the right of the course, and subtracted if to the left. Thus, if the course is 060° and the heading is 062° at the moment of observation, a correction of 2° is added to the bearing.

See also 

 Compass rose
 Navigation
 Pilotage
 Rhumbline network

References

Further reading 

 J. Lagan (2005). The Barefoot Navigator: Navigating with the Skills of the Ancients. Dobbs Ferry, NY: Sheridan House.
 Tibbets, G.R. (1971). Arab Navigation in the Indian Ocean before the coming of the Portuguese. London: Royal Asiatic Society.
 Tolmacheva, M. (1980). "On the Arab System of Nautical Orientation", Arabica, vol. 27 (2), pp. 180–92.

External links 

 Bowditch Online
 See more examples in the online compass museum COMPASSIPEDIA

Navigational equipment
Orientation (geometry)
Measuring instruments
Navigational aids